New Jersey's 21st Legislative District is one of 40 in the New Jersey Legislature. As of the 2011 apportionment, the district includes the Morris County communities of Chatham Borough and
Long Hill Township; the Somerset County municipalities of Bernards Township, Far Hills, Warren Township and Watchung; the Union County municipalities of Berkeley Heights, Cranford, Garwood, Kenilworth, Mountainside, New Providence, Roselle Park, Springfield Township, Summit and Westfield.

Demographic characteristics
As of the 2020 United States census, the district had a population of 224,546, of whom 170,852 (76.1%) were of voting age. The racial makeup of the district was 160,014 (71.3%) White, 7,465 (3.3%) African American, 437 (0.2%) Native American, 26,753 (11.9%) Asian, 47 (0.0%) Pacific Islander, 8,611 (3.8%) from some other race, and 21,219 (9.4%) from two or more races. Hispanic or Latino of any race were 26,156 (11.6%) of the population. 

The 21st District had 176,112 registered voters as of December 1, 2021, of whom 66,455 (37.7%) were registered as unaffiliated, 59,939 (34.0%) were registered as Democrats, 48,411 (27.5%) were registered as Republicans, and 1,307 (0.7%) were registered to other parties.

The densely populated district is one of the wealthiest in the state, with the highest equalized property value and income on a per capita basis. Standardized test schools in the district's public schools were the highest of all districts statewide, and the district placed third in the percentage of 9th graders graduating from high school. Voter registration and turnout in the 21st District is among the highest in the state.

Political representation
For the 2022–2023 session, the district is represented in the State Senate by Jon Bramnick (R, Westfield) and in the General Assembly by Michele Matsikoudis (R, New Providence) and Nancy Munoz (R, Summit).

The district is located within the New Jersey's 7th, New Jersey's 10th, and New Jersey's 11th congressional districts.

Apportionment history
When the 40-district legislative map was created in 1973, the 21st District was originally  in eastern Union County consisting of Elizabeth, Linden, and Winfield Township plus Carteret in Middlesex County. In the 1981 redistricting, the 21st district became based out of central Union County, centered about Kenilworth and inclusive of the municipalities that border Kenilworth plus Westfield, Garwood, Roselle, and Hillside. In the next redistricting in 1991, a major change occurred to the district's boundaries: It now consisted of northern Union County from Roselle Park and Union Township, then north into the west side of Essex County from Millburn to North Caldwell and Cedar Grove.

After a single term in the Senate, Thomas G. Dunn was dropped by the Union County Democrats in 1977 and was replaced on the party line by Linden Mayor John T. Gregorio. Dunn ran as an independent and lost to Gregorio in the general election.

Edward K. Gill, elected to the Assembly in 1981 after C. Louis Bassano ran for the Senate, had announced that he would not run for a third term in the Assembly shortly before his death in February 1985. Peter J. Genova was elected in a special election to fill Gill's vacant seat.

Joel Weingarten was elected to the Assembly in a November 1996 special election in which he defeated Democratic candidate Robert R. Peacock to fill the one year remaining on the vacant seat of Monroe Jay Lustbader, who had died in office in March 1996.

Changes to the district made as part of the legislative redistricting in 2001, based on the results of the 2000 United States Census removed Kenilworth and Union Township (both to the 20th Legislative District) Caldwell, Essex Fells, Livingston Township, North Caldwell Township and Roseland (all to the 27th Legislative District), Cedar Grove and Verona (both to the 40th Legislative District) and added Berkeley Heights Township, Chatham Township, Cranford Township, Garwood, Long Hill Township, Mountainside, New Providence, Warren Township, Watchung and Westfield (from the 22nd Legislative District), Harding Township (from the 25th Legislative District) and Madison (from the 26th Legislative District). The 2011 apportionment added Chatham Borough (from District 26), Bernards Township (from District 16), Far Hills (from District 16) and Kenilworth (from District 20). Removed were Chatham Township, Harding Township, Madison, and Millburn, all of which were shifted into the 27th Legislative District.

A special convention of Republican Party delegates chose Nancy Munoz in May 2009 to succeed her husband, Eric Munoz,  following his death in March of that year.

Election history

Election results

Senate

General Assembly

References

Morris County, New Jersey
Somerset County, New Jersey
Union County, New Jersey
21